St. Elizabeth's or St. Elisabeth's Church may refer to:

United States 
(by U.S. state)
 St. Elizabeth's Catholic Church (De Valls Bluff, Arkansas)
 St. Elizabeth's Church (Denver, Colorado)
 St. Elizabeth's Catholic Church (Louisville, Kentucky)
 St. Elizabeth of Hungary Catholic Church (Baltimore, Maryland)
 Saint Elizabeth's Church (Tecumseh, Michigan)
 St. Elizabeth's Church (Manhattan), New York
 St. Elizabeth of Hungary Church (New York City), New York
St. Elizabeth's Memorial Chapel, Tuxedo, New York
 Saint Elizabeth of the Hill Country Catholic Church, Boone, North Carolina
 St. Elizabeth of Hungary Catholic Church (Cleveland, Ohio)
 St. Elizabeth's Convent, Cornwells Heights, Pennsylvania

Europe 
 St Elizabeth's Church, Ashley, England
 St Elisabeth's Church, Reddish, England
 St. Elizabeth's Church, Marburg, Germany
 St. Elizabeth's Church, Wiesbaden, Germany
 Herzogspitalkirche (St. Elisabeth Hospital), Munich, Germany
Elisabethenkirche, Basel, Switzerland
 St. Elizabeth's Church, Wrocław, Poland
 St. Elisabeth's Church, Königsberg, Prussia
 St Elisabeth Cathedral, Košice, Slovakia
 Blue Church (Church of St. Elizabeth), Bratislava, Slovakia

Other places 
 St. Elizabeth's Anglican Church, Westville, South Africa
 Santa Isabel, Paso de los Toros, Uruguay
 St. Elizabeth's Anglican Church, Toronto, Ontario, Canada

See also 
 St. Elizabeth's (disambiguation)
 Saint Elizabeth (disambiguation)